A Place on Earth: The Greatest Hits is the second greatest hits album by American singer Belinda Carlisle, released in the UK on November 30, 1999, by Virgin Records. A limited edition was released with a bonus disc featuring remixes and rare b-sides. A European edition was also released with an interview CD featuring Belinda providing answers to over 40 questions sent in by fans.

Three new tracks were recorded especially for this compilation - "Feels Like I've Known You Forever", "A Prayer for Everyone" and "All God's Children" which was released as a single. A promotional release of an edited version of "A Prayer for Everyone" was issued to Swedish radio stations but went unreleased. All three new tracks would later be released on a re-issue of Carlisle's final Virgin studio album "Real".

The bonus disc included two non-album tracks ("Only a Dream", and "The Air You Breathe") originally released in 1992 as B-sides. These were for the singles "Half the World" and "Little Black Book".

Despite being released only seven years after her previous greatest hits compilation, The Best of Belinda, Volume 1, the collection was a success in the UK where it made the top 20 and was certified gold.

Track listing

Charts

Certifications

References

1999 greatest hits albums
Belinda Carlisle albums
Virgin Records compilation albums
1999 remix albums
Virgin Records remix albums